Muhammad Iqbal Kalhoro (born 19 July 1968) has been Justice of the Sindh High Court since 30 May 2014.

References

1968 births
Living people
Judges of the Sindh High Court
Pakistani judges